is a city located in Fukushima Prefecture, Japan. , Iwaki had a population of 337,765 in 143,500 households, and population density of 270 persons per km2. Iwaki is a designated core city, and is also one of the growing number of cities written in hiragana. The present Iwaki City started as the merger of 14 smaller municipalities on October 1, 1966. Every year, Iwaki hosts the Taira Tanabata Festival from 6–8 August.

Geography and climate
The city is located at the southeastern end of Tōhoku region and borders on Ibaraki Prefecture. The city occupies around 8.9 percent of the total area of Fukushima Prefecture. The western part is a range of mountains and forests, which occupies about 70 percent of the city. The rivers which flow to the east from the mountains have riverbeds with steep inclines that form the deep valleys of the Natsuigawa Gorge and the Shidokigawa Gorge. The flatter eastern part of the city is where most of the population is located. There are seven beaches on the coastline. Off the coast of Iwaki, the warm Kuroshio Current and the cold Oyashio Current meet and make for an abundant fishing ground. The city's flag and seal depict the meeting of these two currents. The prevailing winds from the ocean are warm and wet.

Neighboring municipalities
North: Kawauchi, Naraha, Hirono
West: Tamura, Ono, Hirata, Furudono
South: Kitaibaraki (Ibaraki)

Climate
Iwaki is situated in a temperate climate zone (Köppen climate classification Cfa or humid subtropical climate) and has a moderate climate. The duration of bright sunshine is 2058.1 hours in average year.

Natural environment
Rivers: Natsuigawa River, Samegawa River, Yoshimagawa River, Fujiwara River
Gorges: Natsuigawa Gorge, Shidokigawa Gorge
Mountains: Mizuishiyama, Yunodake, Futatsuyasan, Ishimoriyama
Hot springs： Iwaki Yumoto Onsen

Demographics
Per Japanese census data, the population of Iwaki has remained relatively steady over the past 60 years.

History

The area of present-day Iwaki was part of ancient Mutsu Province.  The forms いわき, 石城, 岩城, 巖城, 巌城, and 磐城 are all ways of writing "Iwaki", which means "rocky castle". Under the Nara period Taika Reform of 645 AD, the central government formed "Iwaki district (磐城郡)" in the northern part of the present city and "Kikuta district (菊多郡)" in the southern part.  In 653, the Iwaki district incorporated part of Taga Province and became Iwaki district (岩城評).  In 718, Iwaki Province was formed, which was composed of five districts with Mutsu Province: Iwaki (岩城), Shineha, Namekata, Uta, Watari and Kikuta which was given from Hitachi Province.  Shineha was the present Naraha. Namekata and Uta were the present Sōma. Watari was the present Watari, Miyagi. The area of the present Iwaki City was composed of Kikuta and Iwaki (岩城 or 磐城). The Yamato government constructed the Nakoso barrier  around 708 AD against possible invasion by the Emishi tribes in the north.

In the late 11th century, the Iwaki clan (岩城氏) of Hitachi Province invaded Iwaki district (磐城郡) and divided it into four districts of Yoshima, Iwasaki, Iwaki, Naraha. The clan ruled the area from the Kamakura period to the end of the Sengoku period. In 1600, Iwaki Sadataka opposed Tokugawa Ieyasu during the Battle of Sekigahara and as a result, the Iwaki clan was deposed. Torii Tadamasa was appointed as daimyō of Iwakitaira Domain under the Edo period Tokugawa shogunate, with an assessed kokudaka of 100,000 koku and constructed Iwakitaira Castle. The domain covered only a portion of what is now Iwaki city: other parts of the city were under the control of Izumi Domain (1634) and Yunagaya Domain (1670).  All three domains joined the Ōuetsu Reppan Dōmei during the Bakumatsu period in support of the Tokugawa against the Satchō Alliance during the Boshin War, but following the Meiji Restoration, and the 1871 Abolition of the han system The new Meiji government created Iwakitaira Prefecture, Yunagaya Prefecture and Izumi Prefecture, which were incorporated to Iwamae (Iwasaki) Prefecture (磐前県) and to the current Fukushima Prefecture (1876).  In 1896, Iwaki Bank and Taira Bank were established.

In 1897, the Japanese Government Railway filled in the inner moat of Iwakidaira Castle and built Taira Station. The Jōban coalfield, the largest coalfield in Honshū and the nearest to the Japanese capital Tokyo, was developed, and the population of Taira increased to support the exploitation of the coalfield. The Jōban Line was made for the haulage of the coal. Iwaki's fishery, forestry and agricultural sectors also developed from this time.  After World War II, the Jōban coalfield was closed. The same natural hot springs that were troublesome to the coal miners were put to good use and a hot springs resort was developed Spa Resort Hawaiians.

The present city was incorporated on October 1, 1966, with the merger of 14 municipalities (5 cities, 4 towns and 5 villages). The cities were Taira (平), Uchigō (内郷), Iwaki (磐城), Nakoso (勿来), and Jōban (常磐); the towns, Yotsukura, (四倉) Tōno (遠野), Ogawa (小川) and Hisanohama (久之浜); and the five villages were Yoshima (好間), Miwa (三和), Tabito (田人), Kawamae (川前) and Ōhisa (大久). Taira was chosen as the location for the city hall and other administrative offices and continues to function as the centre of Iwaki. In April 1979, an "Iwaki Number" as an automobile number plate was introduced.

On April 1, 1999, the city was designated a core city with increased autonomy from the prefectural government.

On 11 March 2011, the city was struck by an earthquake and followed by a tsunami. By 20 May 2011, 303 were dead and 82 still missing.

Government
Iwaki has a mayor-council form of government with a directly elected mayor and a unicameral city legislature of 37 members. The city contributes 10 members to the Fukushima Prefectural Assembly. In terms of national politics, Iwaki is part of the Fukushima 5th District (along with Futaba District) for a seat in the lower house of the Diet of Japan.

Mayors
Transition manager  1964–
1st  1966–
2nd  1974–
3rd  1986–
4th  1990–
5th  1997
6th  2005–

Subdivisions
Iwaki is a decentralised city created the merger of 14 municipalities  (5 cities, 4 towns and 5 villages).

The central area of Iwaki is the former city of Taira, which has Iwaki City Hall, Iwaki City Lyceum, Iwaki Station, etc.  Onahama and Yumoto were annexed by Iwaki in 1954, prior to the 1966 merger.  Yumoto is home to Iwaki Yumoto Onsen, one of the oldest onsen in Japan, with many ryokan hotels. It is also home to Spa Resort Hawaiians, a spa resort which draws 1.5 million visitors per year and was the subject of the 2006 movie Hula Girls. Onahama is a port town where many factories, fisheries and port facilities are located. There is also an aquarium, some beaches and seaside restaurants. 

There are thirteen zones (hamlets or ) within the city.

 Taira
 Onahama & Ena & Izumi
 Nakoso & Nishiki & Ueda
 Jōban & Yumoto
 Uchigō
 Yotsukura
 Tōno
 Ogawa
 Yoshima
 Miwa
 Tabito
 Kawamae
 Hisanohama & Ōhisa

As of October 1, 2007

Economy
The main foundations of economy are industry and agriculture. In particular, Iwaki is a centre for manufacturing machinery, wood based products and chemicals. The industrial production of Iwaki City is #1 in Tōhoku region. Iwaki is rich in sightseeing resources and 7.64 million tourists visit annually. Within Fukushima prefecture, the industrial and sightseeing center is Iwaki, while the political center is Fukushima city. The Nakoso Thermal Power Station, a large coal-fired thermal power station is located in Iwaki.

Statistics (2006)
Employed population: 174,048
Unemployed population: 121,802
Gross production: ¥1,293,782 billion
Number of tourists: 7,639,296

Major companies

Major companies with head offices in Iwaki

Daio Paper Corp.; TYO1
Joban Kosan Co., Ltd.; Spa Resort Hawaiians, TYO1
Honeys Co., Ltd.; boutique shops, TYO1
Nippon Kasei Chemical Company Limited, TYO1
Maruto supermarkets
Tōyō system; secondary battery
Yugetsu

Major companies with factories in Iwaki

Alps Electric Co. & Alpine Electronics; TYO1
Arakawa Chemical Industries, Ltd; TYO1, OSE1
S. T. Corporation (old S.T. Chemistry); TYO1
Okamoto Industries, Inc.; TYO1
Cleanup Corporation; TYO1
Kureha Corporation; TYO1, OSE1
Mazda; TYO1
Nissan Motors; TYO1
Organo Corp.; TYO1
Mitsubishi Materials Corporation; TYO1
Aska Pharmaceutical Co., Ltd.; TYO1
Nichiha Corporation; NSE1, TYO1
Nippon Paper Industries Co., Ltd.
Merck KGaA; DAX
Merck & Co.; NYSE

Banks
(As of 2007)

Iwaki Credit Association
Himawari Credit Association
Toho Bank
Fukushima Bank
Daito Bank
Joyo Bank
The 77 Bank
Tohoku Industrial Bank
Abukuma Trust Bank
Akita Bank
Mizuho Bank
National Life Finance Corporation

Fisheries
Fishery: 75,628t (2003)

Import and export
Onahama Port (2003)
Import: 5,133,727t
Export: 514,045t

Transportation
Surrounded by the ocean and mountains, Iwaki is more closely connected to Mito in neighboring Ibaraki Prefecture than to the Nakadōri  region of Fukushima, including Kōriyama or the prefectural capital of Fukushima). Iwaki is 75 km from Kōriyama, 150 km from Sendai and 95 km from Mito. The Jōban Line runs north and south in the city. The central station is Iwaki Station, which is also a terminus for the East Ban'etsu Line which links Iwaki to Kōriyama.

Railway

JR East – Jōban Line
  -  -  -   -  -  -  -  -  - 
JR East – Ban'etsu East Line
Iwaki -  -  -  - 
Fukushima Rinkai Railway Main Line (freight line)
Izumi - Miyashita Freight Terminal - Onahama Freight Terminal
¤This line carries passenger only on the day of Onahama firework festival

Highway

 - Iwaki Nakoso Interchange - Iwaki Yumoto Interchange - Yunotake Parking Area – Iwaki Junction - Iwaki Chūō Interchange - Iwaki Yotsukura Interchange
 - Iwaki Junction - Iwaki-Miwa Interchange

Bus operators

City buses
Shin Jōban Kōtsū

Highway buses
Shin Jōban Kōtsū
JR Bus Tōhoku
JR Bus Kantō
Tōbu Bus Central
Fukushima Transportation
Aizu Bus

Ports
Onahama Port
Nakanosaku Port
Ena Port
Hisanohama Port

Sport
Iwaki-Taira Velodrome is located within the city.

Public institutions

Taira

Iwaki City Hall (main)
Iwaki Green Stadium
Iwaki athletic field
Iwaki civil pools
Iwaki gymnasium
Iwaki Velodrome
Iwaki Lyceum "Alios"
Iwaki cultural center
Iwaki central library
Iwaki museum
Iwaki central park

Nakoso
Nakoso branch office
Iwaki Nakoso Lyceum

Uchigō
Uchigō branch office
Iwaki Uchigō Community Center

Onahama
Onahama branch office
Iwaki Onahama baseball ground
Onahama civil pools
Iwaki Onahama Lyceum
Aquamarine Fukushima

Jōban (Yumoto)
Jōban branch office
The 21st-century forest park
Iwaki Green Stadium (capacity of 30,000)
Iwaki Green Field (soccer, rugby, football)
Iwaki Jōban Lyceum
Iwaki Coal and Fossils Museum

Others

Hisanohama and Ōhisa branch office
Yotsukura branch office
Kawamae branch office
Ogawa branch office
Yoshima branch office
Miwa branch office
Toyoma branch office
Ena branch office
Chūōdai service center
Izumi branch office
Ueda branch office
Tabito branch office
Tōno branch office
Iwaki southern forest's sports park
Kurashi no Denshōgō
Kusano Shimpei Memorial
Iwaki Anmonites Center

Education

Universities and Colleges
Fukushima National College of Technology
Iryo Sosei University
Higashi Nippon International University 
 Iwaki Junior College

Senior high schools
Iwaki has 14 public high schools operated by the Fukushima Prefectural Board of Education. There is one private high school and three private combined middle/high schools. The prefecture also operates three special education schools within Iwaki.
Public (prefectural)

 Iwaki High School (磐城高等学校)
 Iwaki Sakuragaoka High School (磐城桜が丘高等学校)
 Iwaki Kōyō High School (いわき光洋高等学校)
 Iwaki Nōgyō High School (磐城農業高等学校)
 Iwaki Sōgō High School (いわき総合高等学校)
 Iwaki Kaisei High School (いわき海星高等学校)
 Iwaki Yumoto High School(いわき湯本高等学校)
 Taira Kōgyō High School (平工業高等学校)
 Taira Shōgyō High School (平商業高等学校)
Nakoso High School (勿来高等学校)
Nakoso Kōgyō High School (勿来工業高等学校)
Onahama High School (小名浜高等学校)
Yoshima High School (好間高等学校)
Yotsukura High School (四倉高等学校)

Private
Iwaki Shūei High School (いわき秀英高等学校)
Shōhei High School (東日本国際大学附属昌平高等学校)
Iwaki First High School (磐城第一高等学校)
Iwaki Second High School (磐城第二高等学校)

Junior high schools
Iwaki has 39 public junior high schools. There are three private combined junior/senior high schools (listed above). The city also operates 67 public elementary schools.
Public (municipal)

Taira First Junior High School (平第一中学校)
Taira Second Junior High School (平第二中学校)
Taira Third Junior High School (平第三中学校)
Fujima Junior High School (藤間中学校)
Toyoma Junior High School (豊間中学校)
Kusano Junior High School (草野中学校)
Akai Junior High School (赤井中学校)
Yumoto First Junior High School (湯本第一中学校)
Yumoto Second Junior High School (湯本第二中学校)
Yumoto Third Junior High School (湯本第三中学校)
Iwasaki Junior High School (磐崎中学校)
Onahama First Junior High School (小名浜第一中学校)
Onahama Second Junior High School (小名浜第二中学校)
Izumi Junior High School (泉中学校)
Ena Junior High School (江名中学校)
Uchigō First Junior High School (内郷第一中学校)
Uchigō Second Junior High School (内郷第二中学校)
Uchigō Third Junior High School (内郷第三中学校)
Ueda Junior High School (植田中学校)
Ueda Higashi Junior High School (植田東中学校)
Nishiki Junior High School (錦中学校)
Nakoso First Junior High School (勿来第一中学校)
Nakoso Second Junior High School (勿来第二中学校)
Kawabe Junior High School (川部中学校)
Katōno Junior High School (上遠野中学校)
Iritōno Junior High School (入遠野中学校)
Yotsukura Junior High School (四倉中学校)
Ōno Junior High School (大野中学校)
Ogawa Junior High School (小川中学校)
Tabito Junior High School (田人中学校)
Yoshima Junior High School (好間中学校)
Nagai Junior High School (永井中学校)
Miwa Junior High School (三和中学校)
Misaka Junior High School (三阪中学校)
Saiso Junior High School (差塩中学校)
Kawamae Junior High School (川前中学校)
Okeuri Junior High School (桶売中学校)
Ojiroi Junior High School (小白井中学校)
Hisanohama Junior High School (久之浜中学校)
Tamagawa Junior High School (玉川中学校)
Chūōdai Kita Junior High School (中央台北中学校)
Chūōdai Minami Junior High School (中央台南中学校)

Media

Television
NHK Fukushima 
Fukushima Central Television (by Nippon TV)
Fukushima Broadcasting (by TV Asahi)
Fukushima Television Broadcasting (by Fuji)
TV-U Fukushima (by TBS)

Newspapers
Fukushima Mimpō (Fukushima, Mainichi)
Iwaki Mimpō
Fukushima Min-Yū (Fukushima, Yomiuri)

Radio
Sea Wave (cFM J-Wwave)

Twinnings

Japanese sister cities
Nobeoka, Miyazaki (since May 30, 1997); a sister city
Yurihonjō, Akita (since August 10, 1986); a sister city. Yurihonjō City includes old , which has the same name, "Iwaki".

International friendship and sister cities
 Townsville, Queensland, Australia (sister city since August 21, 1991)
 Fushun, Liaoning Province, China (friendship city since April 15, 1982)
 Kauai County, Hawaii, United States (sister city since 2011)

Local attractions
Iino Hachimangū Shinto shrine
Iwaki Onahama Minato Oasis
Iwaki Sun Marina
Aquamarine Park
Aquamarine Fukushima, an aquarium
Iwaki La La Miu
Iwaki Day Crews
Iwaki Marine Tower
"Iwaki seven beaches"
Shioyazaki lighthouse
Monuments of Misora Hibari

Setogarō, a scenic ravine, named by Kusano Shimpei
Iwaki Yumoto Onsen, one of the three old hot springs in Japan
Spa Resort Hawaiians, hot spring and leisure park.
Iwaki Coal and Fossils Museum
Nakoso Barrier, was built against Emishi in Yamato period. "Nakoso" means "Don't come over here".
Iwaki Ammonites Center
Shiramizu Amidadō, Buddhist temple. National Treasures of Japan.

Kurashi no Denshōgō, historical facility
Iwaki Taira Keirin, cycle racetrack
Kusano Simpei Memorial Hall

Festivals

Jangara
Iwaki Odori
Onahama Firework Festival
Taira Tanabata Festival

In popular media
 The 2006 film Hula Girls won five awards in 2007 Japan Academy Prize

Notable people from Iwaki
Kusano Shimpei, poet; famous as "poet of frogs"
Denmei Suzuki, actor
Misaki Ito, actress
Miyuki Komatsu, actress
Tadashi Suzuki, discovered Futabasaurus suzukii
Ken-Ichiro Kobayashi, conductor
Takeo Takagi, Imperial Japanese Navy Admiral
Aya Okamoto, actress
Noboru Kousaka, member of the House of Representatives of Japan for the Japan Socialist Party
Rena Takeda, actress

References

External links

Official Website 

 
Cities in Fukushima Prefecture
Port settlements in Japan
Populated coastal places in Japan